Sanjay Kumar Tiwari aka Munna Tiwari is an Indian politician as member of Indian National Congress and MLA from Buxar, Bihar. He was graduated from A.N. Collage, Patna in 1987.

References

Living people
Indian National Congress politicians from Bihar
People from Buxar district
Bihar MLAs 2020–2025
1965 births